Henry Greenway (Birmingham, England, 1833 - St. Louis, Missouri, 1903) was an English-born American harp maker. He created a type of chromatic cross-strung harp displaying X-shaped double pilar and double neck. His workshop was at 545 Atlantic Street in Brooklyn, N.Y.

See also
 Harp
 Cross-strung harp
 Electric harp
 Plucked string instrument
 Experimental musical instrument

References

Bibliography
 Mandel Robert (2010), Classical & Romantic Instrument Marvels, Budapest: Kossuth Publishing.
 André P. Larson (Spring 1995), "Double Chromatic Harp by Henry Greenway", in: South Dakota Musician, Vol. 29, No. 3, p. 28.
 "1994 Acquisitions Include Rare Pianos, Harp, Woodwinds," in: The Shrine to Music Museum Newsletter, vol. 22, no. 2, p. 2.
 The Metropolitan Museum of Art (1989), A Checklist of American Musical Instruments, New York: The Metropolitan Museum of Art.
 Barbara Burn, ed. (1989), A Checklist of European & American Harps, revised ed., New York: The Metropolitan Museum of Art.
 Libin Laurence (1985), American Musical Instruments in The Metropolitan Museum of Art, New York: The Metropolitan Museum of Art.
 Libin Laurence (1979), A Checklist of European Harps: 1, New York: The Metropolitan Museum of Art.
 The Metropolitan Museum of Art (1904), Catalogue of the Crosby Brown Collection of Musical Instruments: Europe, vol. 1, New York: The Metropolitan Museum of Art.

1833 births
1903 deaths
Harp makers
Musical instrument manufacturing companies of the United States